In Full Bloom is a 2021 American neo-noir sports drama film written and directed by Adam VillaSenor and Reza Ghassemi. It stars Tyler Wood, Yusuke Ogasawara, Sean McCracken, Timothy V. Murphy, Hiroyuki Watanabe.

The film had its world premiere at the Oldenburg International Film Festival on September 15, 2019, where it won the top prize, the German Independence Award, and it was released on December 15, 2020.

In Full Bloom won the Grand Jury Award (Feature) at the 2020 Mammoth Film Festival

Plot
In post-WWII Tokyo, Japan's undefeated boxing champion, Masahiro trains in the winter wilderness for his upcoming battle against the American challenger, Clint Sullivan. Sullivan, who's haunted by memories of the war, must overcome the Yakuza's influence to preserve his honor. Pitted against political tensions, the fighters' parallel journeys will test the very limits of human spirit.

Cast
 Tyler Wood as Clint Sullivan
 Yusuke Ogasawara as Masahiro
 S. Scott McCracken as Silas
 Timothy V. Murphy as Roane
 Hiroyuki Watanabe as Tetsuro Tokugawa

Release
On October 7, 2021, it was announced that Henry Cejudo would be the Executive Producer of In Full Bloom and would release in the US on October 15, 2021.

Reception

Stephen Dalton of Hollywood Reporter said that the film was "an impressively polished debut feature, admirably ambitious and elegantly crafted." Film Threat writer Hunter Lanier expressed that the film, "functions as a visually exciting tone poem and as a soulful reflection on battle."
Boxer Mike Tyson boasted about the film saying, "they captured the art of fighting."

References

External links
 Official website
 

2019 independent films
American independent films
Yakuza films
2010s American films
2010s Japanese films